Trachymela sloanei, known generally as the Australian tortoise beetle or small eucalyptus tortoise beetle, is a species of leaf beetle in the family Chrysomelidae.

The species is native to Australia, where it lives on Eucalyptus trees. It is an invasive pest in California, and was recently established in Shenzhen, China.

References

Further reading

External links

 

Chrysomelinae